Gas price may refer to:
 Gasoline and diesel usage and pricing
 Natural gas prices